Stoic is a fully remote video game development company. Founded by three ex-BioWare staff in December 2011, Stoic is most known for developing the tactical role-playing video game The Banner Saga (2014) and its sequels, The Banner Saga 2 (2016) and The Banner Saga 3 (2018).

History
Stoic was founded by Arnie Jorgensen, John Watson and Alex Thomas in early 2012. They left BioWare in 2012 after finishing the production of Star Wars: The Old Republic and wanted to make their "dream game", which would then become The Banner Saga. Using crowdfunding platform Kickstarter, Stoic successfully funded the game within 2 days, though the team initially wanted to fund the game using their own personal savings. The funds raised far exceeded their expectations, thus the team expanded the game's scope to include more features. The team partnered with Versus Evil, which served as the game's publisher, providing services such as quality assurance. The multiplayer portion of the game was soft launched by Stoic in February 2013 via Steam as a standalone game as The Banner Saga: Factions, while the full game was released in January 2014. The game was a critical and commercial success, thus the team was able to fund the development of The Banner Saga 2 by themselves.

With development lasting for two years, The Banner Saga 2, like its predecessor, also received generally positive reviews when it was released in April 2016. When Watson reflected on the game's development, he noted that the team starting crunching as the team slowly ran out of money. The game commercial performance disappointed Stoic, with the title selling just a third of its predecessors. Watson attributed the game's failure to the team neglecting the franchise's community, while Versus Evil's General Manager Steve Escalante believed that the game's underwhelming performance was mainly due to increased competition from other titles. The team returned to Kickstarter again for The Banner Saga 3. While Stoic funded most of the game's development, the funds raised via Kickstarter was spent hiring an animation studio, a sound studio and a recording studio in Iceland to assist the title's development. The $200,000 funding goal was reached within a week. The game, the third and last entry in the trilogy, was released on July 26, 2018. 505 Games released a retail bundle containing all three games on the same day.

Games

References

External links
 

Companies based in Austin, Texas
Video game development companies
Video game companies based in Texas
Video game companies established in 2011
2011 establishments in Texas
Privately held companies based in Texas
Indie video game developers